The 2019 WNBL Finals was the postseason tournament of the WNBL's 2018–19 season. The Townsville Fire were the defending champions, however they failed to qualify for the finals series.

Standings

Bracket

Semi-finals

(1) Canberra Capitals vs. (4) Perth Lynx

(2) Melbourne Boomers vs. (3) Adelaide Lightning

Grand Final

(1) Canberra Capitals vs. (3) Adelaide Lightning

Rosters

References 

Women's National Basketball League Finals
Finals